The High Council on Climate is an independent executive council in the Government of France announced by Emmanuel Macron in 2018 and created on 14 May 2019. The council is meant to address the countries climate policy, and produce reports on the progress of France towards its climate commitments. The organization was formed separately from the  National Council for Ecological Transition which was formed to create a social dialogue body responding to groups, like the Yellow vests movement.

The current chair of the council is Corinne Le Quéré and the council includes 13 scientists and experts in climate change. The council is inspired by the Committee on Climate Change in the UK.

External links
 High Council on Climate

References 

Organizations established in 2018
Political organizations based in France
Politics of climate change